Hoghton is a village in Lancashire, England.

Hoghton may also refer to:

Hoghton Tower, a fortified manor house in Hoghton, Lancashire
Hoghton baronets, of Hoghton Tower
Daniel Hoghton (1770–1811), British Army major-general

See also
Haughton (disambiguation)
Houghton (disambiguation)
Horton (disambiguation)
Horton (surname)